Bird Watching is a British four-weekly (13 issues per year) magazine for birdwatchers, established in March 1986. Distributed by subscription and also through newsagents, it has, as of March 2020, a cover price of £4.60.

History and profile
Bird Watching was established in 1986. Key content areas include bird identification, location guides, recent sightings, product reviews and news.

Its contributors include notable birders such as Dominic Couzens and David Lindo.

Originally published by EMAP, the magazine is published monthly by Bauer Consumer Media of Peterborough. Its ABC-certified total average net circulation/distribution per issue for 2019 was 15,428, of which 3,637 were newsagent sales and 11,603 went to subscribers.

Editors

Bird Watching has had five editors:

 Chris Dawn (1986–88)
 David Cromack (1988–2006)
 Kevin Wilmot (2006–2008)
 Sheena Harvey (2008–2011)
 Matt Merritt (2011–)

See also
List of ornithology journals

References

External links
 Official website
 Official blog

1986 establishments in the United Kingdom
Bauer Group (UK)
Hobby magazines published in the United Kingdom
Journals and magazines relating to birding and ornithology
Magazines established in 1986
Monthly magazines published in the United Kingdom
Ornithology in the United Kingdom
Wildlife magazines
Mass media in Peterborough